Daniel Davies (January 18, 1825 – May 11, 1911) was a Canadian merchant and political figure. He represented King's County in the House of Commons of Canada from 1873 to 1887 as a Conservative.

He was born in Charlottetown, Prince Edward Island and educated there. He went to sea at the age of 16 and later became a shipbuilder and ship owner. In 1853, he married Catherine Cameron. Davies represented Charlottetown in the Legislative Assembly of Prince Edward Island from 1859 to 1866 as a Liberal member, serving as a member of the Executive Council from 1864 to 1866. He retired from politics in 1878. He served as a magistrate for a number of years and was also a director of the Bank of Prince Edward Island and the Charlottetown gas company. Davies was president of the P.E.I. Steam Navigation Co. and the Merchants Marine Insurance Company of Charlottetown. Cameron died in Charlottetown at the age of 86.

References 

1825 births
1911 deaths
People from Charlottetown
Conservative Party of Canada (1867–1942) MPs
Members of the House of Commons of Canada from Prince Edward Island
Prince Edward Island Liberal Party MLAs